Brachyglene albicephala is a moth of the family Notodontidae first described by James S. Miller in 2008. It is endemic to the northern half of Costa Rica.

The length of the forewings is 13–16 mm for males and 16.5–18 mm for females. The ground color of the forewings is evenly blackish brown, with a yellow-orange transverse band of varying width, extending from inside the costa to immediately short of the tornus. The hindwings are blackish brown, but a slightly lighter shade than the forewings.

The larvae feed on Bauhinia guianensis.

Etymology
The species name is said to be derived from the Latin words albi and cephalus and refers to the white head region of this species. In classical Latin, albus (masculine), alba (feminine) or album (neuter) is the proper word for "white". Caput is the actual word for "head" in classical Latin, while in ancient Greek kephalē (κεφαλή) was used for "head". Kephalos (Κέφαλος) was the first name of various Greek mythological and historical figures that was rendered in Latin as Cephalus.

References

Moths described in 2008
Notodontidae